Teresa "Tracy" Bond (born Teresa "Tracy" Draco, and also known as the Contessa Teresa di Vicenzo) is a fictional character and the main Bond girl in the 1963 James Bond novel On Her Majesty's Secret Service, and its 1969 film adaptation.  She is the second Bond girl to marry 007, the first being in You Only Live Twice as an undercover ploy. In the film version, Tracy is played by actress Diana Rigg.

It is suggested that the inspiration for Tracy Bond came from Ian Fleming's wartime romance with Muriel Wright, whom he met whilst skiing in Kitzbühel.  Wright's sudden death from a bomb raid in her London flat in 1944 and Fleming's subsequent grief are reflected in Tracy's own unexpected death and its effect on Bond, evident in the succeeding novels and film adaptations.

Biography
Born Teresa Draco in 1943 (1937 in the novel), she is the only child of Marc-Ange Draco, the head of the Unione Corse, a powerful Corsican crime syndicate – not quite as large as SPECTRE, but with substantially larger "legal" operations, including Draco Construction. Teresa goes by "Tracy", because she feels "Teresa" does not suit her. As she introduced herself to Bond, she stated, "Teresa is a saint; I'm known as Tracy."

Tracy's mother was an English governess who died in 1955; her father then sent her to a boarding school in Switzerland. Deprived of a stable home life, Tracy joined the "international fast set", committing "one scandal after another"; when Draco cut off her allowance, Tracy committed "a greater folly" out of spite. She married Italian Count Giulio di Vicenzo, who got hold of a large portion of her money before leaving her. Draco paid him off for a divorce, but di Vicenzo died while driving a Maserati in the company of one of his mistresses. Tracy had his child, who later died of spinal meningitis.

Desperate with grief for her child, Tracy attempts suicide by walking into the sea in Portugal, but is rescued by James Bond.

When her father meets Bond, he pleads with Bond to continue to see her, claiming that their relationship has changed her for the better. Bond initially refuses, but he changes his mind when Marc-Ange offers his resources for anything Bond desires. Since the events of Thunderball and the demise of SPECTRE, Bond had been hunting for Ernst Stavro Blofeld, and at one point was willing to retire from MI6 because he felt the hunt was folly and that his services and abilities could be used better. Using Draco's resources, however, Bond is able to track Blofeld to Switzerland. In return, Bond continues to see Tracy and eventually falls in love with her. On their wedding day, Blofeld and his henchwoman Irma Bunt engage Bond and Tracy in a drive-by shooting and Tracy is killed.

In the film, Tracy drives a red 1969 model Mercury Cougar XR-7 convertible.

Legacy
In Fleming's novels, Bond is a broken man after Tracy's death. In You Only Live Twice, he has begun drinking heavily, which has affected his work. M is forced to acknowledge that Bond is no longer fit for service. However, he decides to give Bond one last chance and assigns him to an intelligence-related diplomatic affair in Japan. This in turn leads to a duel to the death with Blofeld in the climax of the novel, and Bond is finally awarded his revenge but suffers a head injury that leaves him with amnesia.

In the films, James Bond is tracking Blofeld in the pre-title credits sequence of Diamonds Are Forever. The film does not explain why nor does it mention Tracy. Originally, it had been planned that On Her Majesty's Secret Service would end with Bond and Tracy driving away from their wedding. The scenes where she was shot were filmed at the same time with the intention that they would form the pre-title sequence of Diamonds Are Forever. As a result of George Lazenby leaving the role, these scenes ended up being part of On Her Majesty's Secret Service.

Subsequent films reference the fact that Bond was previously married, but only fleetingly:

 In Live and Let Die, upon Bond's arrival in San Monique, he's informed by the concierge of the hotel he's staying at that "Mrs. Bond" is already there. He's startled at first, but goes along with it and when he meets the woman in question, CIA agent Rosie Carver, he jokingly calls her Mrs. Bond several times.
 In The Spy Who Loved Me, when Bond meets Anya Amasova in the Mujaba Club bar, in Cairo, she summarises his career and personal life to him. When she notes, "... many lady friends, but married only once. Wife killed —", Bond cuts her short by saying, "Alright, you've made your point". Anya comments that he's sensitive. Bond replies, "About certain things, yes".

 In For Your Eyes Only, in the pre-title sequence, Bond lays flowers at Tracy's grave in the churchyard of Church of St Giles, Stoke Poges before boarding a helicopter. The headstone reads: "TERESA BOND, 1943–1969, Beloved Wife of JAMES BOND / We have all the time in the World" – referring to the final words in On Her Majesty's Secret Service, which became that movie's theme song. The headstone shows Tracy died in 1969, the same year On Her Majesty's Secret Service was released.
 In Licence to Kill, after Felix Leiter's wedding, Felix's new wife Della throws her garter at Bond, teasing him, "the next one who catches this is the next one who ..." Bond looks visibly pained; when Della asks Felix about it, Felix makes a short, sad reference to Bond once having been married, "but that was a long time ago."
 In GoldenEye, Alec Trevelyan goads Bond, "I might as well ask you if all those vodka martinis ever silence the screams of all the men you've killed ... or if you find forgiveness in the arms of all those willing women for all the dead ones you failed to protect."
 In The World Is Not Enough, Elektra King asks Bond if he's "ever lost a loved one." Bond pauses and brushes off the question.

Movie props
Tracy's wedding dress is now kept at the Admiral Hotel in Milan, along with a big collection of James Bond and Chitty-Chitty-Bang-Bang items.

References 

Bond girls
Fictional socialites
On Her Majesty's Secret Service
Literary characters introduced in 1963
Characters in British novels of the 20th century
Fictional counts and countesses
Fictional attempted suicides
Fictional murdered people